Thalassotalea montiporae  is a Gram-negative, rod-shaped, aerobic and motile bacterium from the genus of Thalassotalea with a single polar flagellum which has been isolated from the coral Montipora aequituberculata from the coast of Taiwan.

References

External links
Type strain of Thalassotalea montiporae at BacDive -  the Bacterial Diversity Metadatabase

 

Alteromonadales
Bacteria described in 2016